Resolution Island may refer to;

Resolution Island (Nunavut), an island in northern Canada
Resolution Island, New Zealand, an island in southwestern New Zealand
Resolution Island, a fictional island in the novel Brown on Resolution